The 2003 Virginia 500 was the ninth stock car race of the 2003 NASCAR Winston Cup Series season and the 54th iteration of the event. The race was held on Sunday, April 13, 2003, before an audience of 86,000 in Martinsville, Virginia at Martinsville Speedway, a  permanent oval-shaped short track. The race took the scheduled 500 laps to complete. In the final laps of the race, Hendrick Motorsports driver Jeff Gordon would manage to pass Joe Gibbs Racing driver Bobby Labonte to capture his 62nd career NASCAR Winston Cup Series victory and his first victory of the season. To fill out the top three, Labonte and Dale Earnhardt, Inc. driver Dale Earnhardt Jr. would finish second and third, respectively.

Background 

Martinsville Speedway is an NASCAR-owned stock car racing track located in Henry County, in Ridgeway, Virginia, just to the south of Martinsville. At 0.526 miles (0.847 km) in length, it is the shortest track in the NASCAR Cup Series. The track was also one of the first paved oval tracks in NASCAR, being built in 1947 by H. Clay Earles. It is also the only remaining race track that has been on the NASCAR circuit from its beginning in 1948.

Entry list 

 (R) denotes rookie driver.

Practice

First practice 
The first practice session was held on Friday, April 11, at 11:20 AM EST. The session would last for two hours.

Second practice 
The second practice session was held on Saturday, April 12, at 9:30 AM EST. The session would last for 45 minutes.

Final practice 
The final practice session, sometimes referred to as Happy Hour, was held on Saturday, April 12, at 11:10 AM EST. The session would last for 45 minutes.

Qualifying 
Qualifying was held on Friday, April 11, at 3:05 PM EST. Each driver would have two laps to set a fastest time; the fastest of the two would count as their official qualifying lap. Positions 1-36 would be decided on time, while positions 37-43 would be based on provisionals. Six spots are awarded by the use of provisionals based on owner's points. The seventh is awarded to a past champion who has not otherwise qualified for the race. If no past champ needs the provisional, the next team in the owner points will be awarded a provisional.

No drivers would fail to qualify.

Full qualifying results

Race results

References 

2003 NASCAR Winston Cup Series
NASCAR races at Martinsville Speedway
April 2003 sports events in the United States
2003 in sports in Virginia